The Battle of Castelo Rodrigo, also known as the Battle of Salgadela, was fought on 7 July 1664, near Figueira de Castelo Rodrigo, between Spanish and Portuguese as part of the Portuguese Restoration War.

After a number of skirmishes, the Duke of Osuna attacked the castle of Castelo Rodrigo with 7,000 men and 9 pieces of artillery.
The castle was only defended by 150 Portuguese.

The military commander of the province, Pedro Jacques de Magalhães, rallied 3,000 men and moved to the rescue of Castelo Rodrigo.

A battle took place near the village of Mata de Lobos in "Salgadela" which was won by the Portuguese. After an initial Spanish attack was repelled, the Portuguese counter-attack proved decisive. Many prisoners were taken and all the artillery pieces captured. It is told that Osuna and John of Austria the Younger, escaped disguised as monks.

A memorial stone was placed on the site of the battlefield.

References
John Murray (Firm), A handbook for travellers in Portugal: A complete guide for Lisbon, Cintra, Mafra, the British battle-fields, Alcobaça, Batalha, Oporto, &c (1864)
Ângelo Ribeiro: História de Portugal: A Restauração da Independência-O início da Dinastia de Bragança (2004) 
John Colin Dunlop, Memoirs of Spain during the reigns of Philip IV. and Charles II. from 1621 to 1700 (1834)

Castel Rodrigo
Castel Rodrigo
1664 in Portugal
Castelo Rodrigo
Figueira de Castelo Rodrigo
Castelo Rodrigo